Otrøya (sometimes called Otterøya or Otrøy) is the largest island in Molde Municipality in Møre og Romsdal county, Norway. The  island sits at the entrance to Romsdalsfjord, west of the island of Midøya and east of the mainland Romsdal peninsula.

The main settlement is the village of Midsund on the west end of the island. Other settlements include Uglvik and Raknes on the north side of the island and Nord-Heggdal on the southeast side of the island. The Church of Norway has two churches on the island: Otrøy Church and Nord-Heggdal Chapel.

The Midsund Bridge connects Otrøya to the island of Midøya to the west. On the east end of the island, there is a ferry connection across the Julsundet strait to the village of Mordal in Molde Municipality.

See also
List of islands of Norway

References

Molde
Islands of Møre og Romsdal